1-Methylindole is an irritating, potentially toxic organic compound which occurs as a deep yellow viscous liquid with a very strong unpleasant odor.
It has the chemical formula C9H9N.

See also

 Indole
 Methyl
 2-Methylindole (methylketol)
 5-Methylindole
 7-Methylindole
 Skatole (3-methylindole)

References

Methylindoles